Hans von Ahlfen (20 February 1897 – 11 September 1966) was a  general in the  German Army in the Second World War. He was the commandant of 'Fortress Breslau' at the beginning of the siege of the city in early 1945, but was dismissed by Hitler because of strategic differences.

Early career
Ahlfen was born in Berlin and joined the army in October 1914 as an officer cadet. He served in the First World War as a lieutenant in an engineer battalion and as a commander of armoured trains.  Between the wars he was retained in the Reichswehr, serving mostly with the 2nd Pioneer Battalion, before becoming an instructor at the Military Academy in August 1935. He had a military textbook entitled Service with the Pioneers published in 1937.

Second World War
At the outbreak of the Second World War, Ahlfen was a lieutenant colonel in the army. He was given command of a motorised pioneer battalion, serving on the eastern front and later in Norway.

On 30 January 1945 Ahlfen was promoted to major general and appointed by Field Marshal Ferdinand Schörner as the commandant of the city of Breslau which Adolf Hitler had declared in August 1944 to be a ‘fortress’, to be defended at all costs. He was soon in conflict with the Gauleiter of the city Karl Hanke who had been declared Breslau’s “battle commander” by Hitler. Hanke advocated a breakout using parachute troops which Ahlfen did not consider realistic and he disagreed with him on several other issues, including the construction of an auxiliary airstrip that would be less vulnerable to attack. On the orders of Schörner and at the instigation of Hanke he was replaced as commandant by General of the Infantry  Hermann Niehoff on 5 March 1945. Great loss of life and destruction then followed during the Siege of Breslau as Soviet forces sought to capture the city which held out for two months defended partly by elderly Volkssturm home guard and boys from the Hitler Youth, with little defence against air attacks.

Postwar author
Ahlfen was captured by the Western Allies on 17 April 1945 whilst serving with Army Group B as General of Pioneers and was released from captivity on 30 June 1947. He then wrote The battle of the fortress Breslau (published by Ernst Siegfried mediator, 1957).  In the next few years he worked with Hermann Niehoff, his successor as the commander of Fortress Breslau on this topic.  In 1959 they jointly published the book So fought Breslau (Graefe and Unzer Verlag, 1959), which was a big commercial success, and a year later, a second expanded edition followed.  In Battle for Silesia (Graefe and Unzer Verlag, 1961) Ahlfen considered the wider conflict in 1945. 
He died in Oberndorf am Neckar aged 69 in 1966.

References

1897 births
1966 deaths
Military personnel from Berlin
German Army generals of World War II
Major generals of the German Army (Wehrmacht)
Recipients of the clasp to the Iron Cross, 1st class
German Army personnel of World War I
Prussian Army personnel
Reichswehr personnel
People from the Province of Brandenburg